Lydia Alfonsi (28 April 1928 – 21 September 2022) was an Italian actress.

Life and career 
Born Lidia Alfonsi in Parma into a wealthy middle-class family, Alfonsi interrupted her accounting studies at a young age to pursue a career in theater. In 1946 she won in a national competition for amateur dramatics and was noticed by one of the judges, the director Anton Giulio Bragaglia, who immediately hired her for his stage company. Soon she was cast in leading roles in dramas and often in classical works, including many Greek tragedies. In 1957 she made her film debut. In 1960 she began a professional and romantic relationship with television director Giacomo Vaccari, starring in several successful RAI TV-dramas directed by him. Their relationship ended with his death in a car accident in 1963. In the mid-1970s Alfonsi semi-retired, making sporadic appearances only in 1988 (with the TV movie Una lepre con la faccia da bambina), in 1990 (in Gianni Amelio's Open Doors) and in 1997 (in Roberto Benigni's Life Is Beautiful).

Alfonsi was appointed Grand Officer of the Italian Republic.

Alfonsi died on 21 September 2022, at the age of 94.

References

External links 

1928 births
2022 deaths
Actors from Parma
Italian stage actresses
Italian film actresses
20th-century Italian actresses
Italian television actresses
Italian voice actresses
Accademia Nazionale di Arte Drammatica Silvio D'Amico alumni
Grand Officers of the Order of Merit of the Italian Republic